Béla the Blind ( – 13 February 1141) was King of Hungary and Croatia from 1131 to 1141. He was blinded along with his rebellious father Álmos on the order of Álmos's brother, King Coloman of Hungary. Béla grew up in monasteries during the reign of Coloman's son Stephen II. The childless king arranged Béla's marriage with Helena of Rascia, who would become her husband's co-ruler throughout his reign.

Béla was crowned king at least two months after the death of Stephen II, implying that his accession to the throne did not happen without opposition. Two violent purges were carried out among the partisans of his predecessors to strengthen Béla's rule. King Coloman's alleged son Boris tried to dethrone Béla but the king and his allies defeated the pretender's troops in 1132. In the second half of Béla's reign, Hungary adopted an active foreign policy. Bosnia and Split seem to have accepted Béla's suzerainty around 1136.

Early years until 1131

Béla was the only son of Duke Álmosthe younger brother of King Coloman of Hungaryby his wife, Predslava of Kiev. Historians Gyula Kristó and Ferenc Makk write that Béla was born between 1108 and 1110.
Álmos devised several plots to dethrone his brother. In retaliation, the king deprived Álmos of his ducatus or "duchy" between 1105 and 1108. Álmos did not give up his ambitions and King Coloman had him and the child Béla blinded between 1112 and 1115 to secure a peaceful succession for his own son, Stephen. According to one of the two versions of these events recorded in the Illuminated Chronicle, the king even ordered that Béla should be castrated but the soldier who was charged with this task refused to execute the order.

After their blinding, Álmos lived in the monastery of Dömös, which he had founded. Kristó and Makk write that it is probable that Béla lived with his father in the monastery. The Annales Posonienses relates that "the child was growing in the reign of King Coloman's son, Stephen", who ascended the throne in 1116. Having hatched a failed plot against the king, Álmos left the monastery and fled to Constantinople in about 1125. For unknown reasons, Béla did not follow his father to the Byzantine Empire. The Illuminated Chronicle narrates that he was kept "concealed in Hungary from the fury" of the king. Béla settled in the Pécsvárad Abbey, whose abbot sheltered him in secret.

Álmos died in exile on 1 September 1127. According to the Illuminated Chronicle, Béla's partisans "revealed to the King, who believed him to have died after his blinding, that Béla was alive". On hearing this, King Stephen II "rejoiced with great joy, for he knew beyond doubt that he would have no heir". The king even arranged Béla's marriage with Helena of Serbia and granted Tolna to the couple around 1129.

King Stephen II died in early 1131. A late sourcethe Ottoman Turkish chronicle known as Tarih-i Üngürüs or The History of the Hungariansnarrates that Béla ascended the throne after his predecessor's nephew Saul, whom Stephen II had nominated as his heir, had died. Béla II was crowned in Székesfehérvár on 28 April, substantiating the reliability of this report. However, no scholarly consensus on the exact circumstances of Béla's ascension exists. According to Gyula Kristó, Béla was crowned by Archbishop Felician after a civil war between his and Saul's partisans, but Pál Engel does not mention any conflict related to Béla's succession.

Reign

Consolidation (1131–1132)

Béla's blindness prevented him from administering his kingdom without assistance. He put his trust in his wife and her brother Beloš. Both royal and private charters from Béla's reign emphasize Queen Helena's pre-eminent role in the decision-making process, proving that the king regarded his wife as his co-ruler. According to the Illuminated Chronicle, at "an assembly of the realm near Arad" in early to mid-1131, Queen Helena ordered the slaughter of all noblemen who were accused of having suggested the blinding of her husband to King Coloman. Béla distributed the goods of the executed magnates between the newly established Arad Chapter and the early 11th-century Óbuda Chapter.

Béla's was on good terms with the Holy Roman Empire, jeopardizing the interests of Boleslaw III of Poland who had been warring with the empire. The Polish monarch decided to support a pretender to the Hungarian crown named Boris. Boris was born to King Coloman's second wife Euphemia of Kiev after his mother was repudiated for adultery. After Boris arrived in Poland, a number of Hungarian noblemen joined him. Others sent messengers to Boris "to invite him that he should come and with their help claim the kingdom for himself", according to the Illuminated Chronicle.

Accompanied by Polish and Rus' reinforcements, Boris broke into Hungary in mid-1132. Béla entered into an alliance with Leopold III, Margrave of Austria. Before launching a counter-attack against Boris, Béla convoked a council on the river Sajó. The Illuminated Chronicle relates that the King asked "the eminent men of Hungary" who were present if they knew whether Boris "was a bastard or the son of King Coloman". The King's partisans attacked and murdered all those who proved to be "disloyal and divided in their minds" during the meeting. Boris, who thought that the majority of the Hungarian lords supported his claim, in vain sent one of his partisans to Béla's camp to incite the King's retinue to mutiny.
 

Béla tried to persuade the Polish monarch to stop supporting the pretender. However, Boleslaw remained loyal to Boris. In the decisive battle, which was fought on the river Sajó on 22 July 1132, the Hungarian and Austrian troops defeated Boris and his allies.

Expansion (1132–1139)

Boleslaw III of Poland could not assist Boris after the Battle of the Sajó. Béla's alliesSoběslav I of Bohemia and Volodimirko of Peremyshlinvaded Poland each year between 1132 and 1135. Soběslav regularlyin 1133, 1134, 1137, and 1139visited Béla's court. The Czech monarch even persuaded Lothar III, Holy Roman Emperor to force Boleslaw III to abandon Boris and recognize Béla's rule in Hungary in August 1135.

Hungary adopted an expansionist policy after Boris's attempts to dethrone Béla. The chronicler Thomas the Archdeacon relates that Gaudius, who became Archbishop of Split in 1136, "enjoyed great favor with the kings of Hungary" and "often visited their court". The report suggests that Split accepted Béla II's suzerainty around 1136, but this interpretation of the sources is not universally accepted by historians. The exact circumstances surrounding the submission of Bosnia are unknown but the region seems to have accepted Béla's suzerainty without resistance by 1137. Historian John V. A. Fine writes that the northeastern regions of the province formed part of Queen Helena's dowry. The Hungarian army penetrated into the valley of the Rama River, a tributary of the Neretva River, in about 1137. Although Béla assumed the title King of Rama in token of the new conquest, the permanent occupation of the region is not proven.

Hungarian troops participated in a campaign launched by Grand Prince Yaropolk II of Kiev against Vsevolod of Kiev in 1139. Béla strengthened his alliance with the Holy Roman Empire. For this purpose, he gave financial support to Otto of Bamberg's missions among the Pomeranians and arranged the engagement of his daughter Sophia with Henry, son of the new German king Conrad III in June 1139.

Last years (1139–1141)

According to the Hungarian chronicles, in the last few years of his life Béla became a drunkard. His courtiers took advantage of his drunkenness to receive grants from him. When he was in an alcoholic stupor, he sometimes ordered the execution of innocent men. Béla died on 13 February 1141, "on the Ides of February, a Thursday". He was buried in the Székesfehérvár Cathedral.

Family

Béla married Helena of Serbia upon the initiation of his cousin, King Stephen II at the beginning of 1129. Helena was a daughter of Uroš I of Rascia and his wife Anna, whose origin is uncertain. Queen Helena gave birth to at least six children. The first of these, the future King Géza II of Hungary, was born in 1130. Three brothersLadislaus, Stephen and Álmoswere born in the early 1130s. Sophia, the first daughter of the royal couple, was born around 1135; she died as a nun in Admont Abbey after her engagement with Henry Berengar of Germany was broken. Béla II's youngest daughter, Elizabeth, who was born in about 1140, married Mieszko III of Poland.

The following family tree presents Béla's ancestors and some of his relatives who are mentioned in the article.

*Whether Géza's first or second wife was his children's mother is uncertain.

See also
 List of deaths through alcohol

References

Sources

Primary sources

Archdeacon Thomas of Split: History of the Bishops of Salona and Split (Latin text by Olga Perić, edited, translated and annotated by Damir Karbić, Mirjana Matijević Sokol and James Ross Sweeney) (2006). CEU Press. .
The Hungarian Illuminated Chronicle: Chronica de Gestis Hungarorum (Edited by Dezső Dercsényi) (1970). Corvina, Taplinger Publishing. .

Secondary sources

Kings of Hungary
Kings of Croatia
12th-century monarchs in Europe
1100s births
1141 deaths
House of Árpád
Blind royalty and nobility
Alcohol-related deaths in Hungary
Burials at the Basilica of the Assumption of the Blessed Virgin Mary
12th-century Hungarian people